Una Rebelde en Solitario is the first compilation album by Mexican singer Anahí. It was released on July 4, 2006, by Fonovisa Records, it is the re-release of Baby Blue.

Track listing
"Desesperadamente Sola"
"Super Enamorandome"
"Es El Amor"
"Aqui Sigues Estando Tu"
"Tu Amor Cayo Del Cielo"
"Como Cada Dia"
"Volveras a Mi"
"Tranquilo Nene"
"Sobredosis de Amor"
"Primer Amor"

Personnel
Credits for Una Rebelde en Solitario:

 Anahí – primary artist
 Eduardo Arias – make-up
 Tim Barnes – viola
 Martin Bejerano –	piano
 Adolfo Pérez Butrón –	photography
 Ed Calle – arranger, saxophone
 Javier Carrion – bass guitar, engineer
 Jessica Chirino – vocals
 Tony Concepcion – trumpet
 Michael "Junno" Cosculluela – vocals
 Estéfano – guitar (acoustic)
 Scott Flavin – violin
 Jim Hacker – trumpet
 Alfredo Oliva – violin
 Eduardo Paz – composer
 Chris Rodriguez – vocals, keyboard programming
 Dana Teboe – trombone

Notes

External links
Anahi official website
Anahi Rocks USA fan club in the USA

2006 albums
Anahí albums